Long Beach Assembly is a former Ford Motor Company assembly plant located at the Cerritos Channel on Terminal Island, at 700 Henry Ford Avenue in Long Beach, Southern California. It operated from 1930 through 1958. 

The former Henry Ford Bridge, crossing the Cerritos Channel from the mainland to Terminal Island, was located near the former plant site.

History
The Ford Model A were the first vehicles to be built, with operations beginning in March, 1930. The location was stopped production of the 1959 Fords on March 20, 1959.  when underground subsidence caused by oil drilling left the facility unstable.  The Los Angeles Assembly plant #2 had opened in Pico Rivera in August 1957 producing first the Edsel and in mid-September 1957, the Mercury. 1959 Ford car production resumed at Los Angeles on April 10, 1959. 

The location was one of several factories designed by architect Albert Kahn who was the chief architect for Ford factories across the US. Through 1948, the location built Lincoln, Mercury and Ford products that were distributed throughout the American Southwest.  In 1948 a Lincoln-Mercury plant opened in Maywood, called Maywood Assembly.

During the Depression of the 1930s, the Long Beach Assembly plant manufactured trucks that were used to build Hoover Dam. The facility was briefly closed from December 1932 until February 1935.

During WWII the location was used as a supply base by the United States Army Air Corps, with automobile production resuming in December, 1945. 

Ford closed earlier Los Angeles Assembly plants that had been operating since 1911: first, at 12th and Olive Streets and after 1914, at East Seventh Street and Santa Fe Avenue.  The factory that built Ford Model T is still standing, having been converted to apartment buildings.

Gallery

References
Ford Long Beach
List of Southern California automobile plants

External links
Historic American Engineering Record (HAER) documentation, filed under 700 Henry Ford Avenue, Long Beach, Los Angeles County, CA:

Ford factories
Historic American Engineering Record in California
Motor vehicle assembly plants in California
Manufacturing companies based in Greater Los Angeles
Companies based in Long Beach, California
Terminal Island
1930 establishments in California
1958 disestablishments in California
Defunct companies based in Greater Los Angeles
History of Long Beach, California